Pharacocerus is a genus of African jumping spiders that was first described by Eugène Louis Simon in 1902.

Species
 it contains seven species and two subspecies, found only in Africa:
Pharacocerus castaneiceps Simon, 1910 – Guinea-Bissau
Pharacocerus ebenauensis Strand, 1908 – Madagascar
Pharacocerus ephippiatus (Thorell, 1899) – Cameroon
Pharacocerus fagei Berland & Millot, 1941 – Ivory Coast
Pharacocerus f. soudanensis Berland & Millot, 1941 – Mali
Pharacocerus f. verdieri Berland & Millot, 1941 – Guinea
Pharacocerus rubrocomatus Simon, 1910 – Congo
Pharacocerus sessor Simon, 1902 (type) – Madagascar
Pharacocerus xanthopogon Simon, 1903 – Equatorial Guinea

References

Salticidae genera
Salticidae
Spiders of Africa